Roger Eugene Toelkes (born November 7, 1935) is an American politician who served as a Democratic member of the Kansas House of Representatives from 2002 to 2004. He represented the 53rd District and lived in Topeka, Kansas. 

Toelkes was appointed to the seat in 2002 to fill the expired term of his wife, Dixie Toelkes, who had held the seat since 1995, but resigned due to health reasons. He was elected in his own right in 2002, but did not seek re-election in 2004.

References

1935 births
Living people
Democratic Party members of the Kansas House of Representatives
21st-century American politicians
Politicians from Topeka, Kansas